Bodelva is a hamlet in south Cornwall, England, UK, in the civil parish of St Blaise. Bodelva is the location of the Eden Project, opened in 2001, a horticultural visitor attraction built in a china clay quarry.

References

Hamlets in Cornwall
Tourist attractions in Cornwall
St Blazey